Nils Peder Langvand (12 June 1929 – 31 October 2002) was a Norwegian judge.

He was born in Volda. He was a presiding judge in Gulating Court of Appeal from 1971 and in Eidsivating Court of Appeal from 1977, and a Supreme Court Justice from 1984 to 1996.

References

1929 births
2002 deaths
Supreme Court of Norway justices
People from Møre og Romsdal
People from Volda